Maia Lumsden was the defending champion, but lost to Yanina Wickmayer in the quarterfinals.

Vitalia Diatchenko won the title, defeating Wickmayer in the final, 5–7, 6–1, 6–4.

Seeds

Draw

Finals

Top half

Bottom half

References
Main Draw

GB Pro-Series Shrewsbury - Singles